Cooper Creek is a stream in Henry and St. Clair counties of Missouri. It is a tributary of Deepwater Creek within the Truman Reservoir.

The stream flows to the northeast into Henry County and passes under Missouri Route 13. The confluence with the Deepwater Creek arm of the Truman Reservoir is at  approximately midway between Deepwater to the northwest and Brownington to the southeast.

Cooper Creek bears the name of a pioneer citizen.

See also
List of rivers of Missouri

References

Rivers of Henry County, Missouri
Rivers of St. Clair County, Missouri
Rivers of Missouri